The legal system of the United Arab Emirates is based on the civil law system with influences from Islamic, French, Roman and Egyptian laws.

Judicial structure 

Under the Constitution of the United Arab Emirates, each Emirate is allowed to either establish its own judiciary or to merge with the federal court system.

Federal Court System

The UAE federal system includes courts of first instance (trial court), courts of appeal and the court of cassation (Supreme Court).

State Court System

The State (or Emirate) judicial system (النظام القضائي المحلي "local judicial system") has also trial, appeal and cassation courts. The Emirates of Dubai, Abu Dhabi and Ras Al-Khaimah have their own courts of cassation.

Criminal law
The UAE penal code is not based completely on Islamic Sharia, but derives several elements from it. Sharia law exists in the UAE and is used in specific circumstances, such as in the payment of blood money. Individual emirates have also suspended some Sharia punishments such as flogging and stoning, replacing them with jail terms and most Sharia system is only enforced to the citizens.

Juveniles 
Under UAE Law, a juvenile is an individual aged 18 or below.  Capital punishment, imprisonment, or fines cannot be imposed as sentences against juveniles who commit criminal offences. The Juveniles law follows a Restorative Justice model focusing on the needs of the young offender. Judges can issue a variety of non-punitive sentences including reprimand, putting young offenders under the supervision of a guardian, or rehabilitation.

In 2015, 40% of all cases examined by prosecutors were related to offences committed by juveniles.

Islamic Law 
The competence of Sharia Courts has been limited by presence of Civil and Criminal Courts. In some Emirates, particularly Abu Dhabi, however, Sharia law came to apply to all types of civil and commercial disputes, capital criminal offences and matters of personal status. Each of the seven federal Emirates maintains a parallel system of Sharia Courts proper to it.

Adultery is illegal in UAE people can be sentenced to 100 lashing if they are unmarried or stoning if they are married, if 4 male witnesses testify or they self confess. Otherwise they can be given 12 month imprisonment based on circumstantial evidence. Rape victims can be given 12 month imprisonment if the rape is not proven such as by DNA and forensic test reports. 

Flogging is a punishment for certain criminal offences (such as adultery, and alcohol consumption by Muslims) and it is applicable to both genders. Between 2007 and 2014, many people in the UAE were sentenced to 100 lashes.

Stoning is a legal punishment under Sharia.  Between 2009 and 2013, several people were sentenced to death by stoning but all were overturned on appeal.

In November 2020, the United Arab Emirates legalized premarital sex, preventing the previous jail sentence for people indulging in sexual intercourse outside wedlock. However, children born out-of-wedlock in the UAE are still considered illegitimate. As per a new law that is proposed to come into effect on 2 January 2022, parents face a minimum of 2 years of jail term on failing to document their children. The law made no mention about health authorities issuing birth certificates to single mothers, leaving the fate of both the parents and the children under threat. Before the 2020 decriminalization, some women gave birth at hospitals with health authorities denying them birth certificates and calling the police instead, fearing which many others resorted to giving birth at shared apartments by themselves.

Punishable offenses

Verbal abuse 
Verbal abuse pertaining to a person's sexual honour is illegal and punishable by 80 lashes. In January 2014, a man in Abu Dhabi was sentenced to 10 years imprisonment and 80 lashes for alcohol consumption and raping a toddler.

Alcohol consumption for Muslims was illegal and punishable by 80 lashes, this is currently no longer the case after a series of judicial relaxations and a brand new penal code. Previously many Muslims had been sentenced to 80 lashes for alcohol consumption. 80 lashes is the standard amount for anyone sentenced to flogging in some emirates. Sometimes 40 lashes were given. Non-Muslims were required to have Alcohol Licenses to be allowed to consume spirits and alcohol. If a license was not obtained, the punishment would have been 1–6 months detention and/or a fine not exceeding 2000 Dirhams (approximately 544 US Dollars). Non-Muslims cannot be punished by flogging under Sharia Principles for consuming alcohol and this had been confirmed by UAE Federal Law No.52 of the year 2006. Drunk-driving is strictly illegal.

Abortion 
Under article 340 of the Penal Code abortion is illegal in the United Arab Emirates except where a woman's life is at risk or the unborn child has a genetic condition that will prove to be fatal. A woman who is found to have undergone an elective abortion may face a penalty of up to one year in prison and a fine up to 10,000 AED.

False allegations crimes
Many western associations state that many women who reported rape but were convicted for false allegations are still victims of rape. This is what they call criminalization of rape victims. The Emirates Center for Human Rights expressed concern over Dubai's criminalization of rape victims.

In Dubai, a woman who engages in consensual extramarital relations and press false allegations of rape can be sentenced to over a year of time in prison.

The Emirates Center for Human Rights states that "Until laws are reformed, victims of sexual violence in the UAE will continue to suffer" referring to a case in July 2013 in which a 24 year old Norwegian woman, Marte Dalelv reported an alleged rape to the police and received a prison sentence for "perjury, illicit [consensual extramarital] sex and alcohol consumption" and false allegations after she admitted lying about the rape.

Apostasy from Islam
Apostasy is a crime punishable by death in the UAE. Blasphemy is illegal, expats involved in insulting Islam are punished by deportation. UAE incorporates hudud crimes of Sharia into its Penal Code - apostasy being one of them. Article 1 and Article 66 of UAE's Penal Code requires hudud crimes to be punished with the death penalty; therefore, apostasy is punishable by death in the UAE.

Dress code violations

The dress code is part of Dubai's criminal law. Most malls in the UAE have a dress code displayed at entrances. At Dubai's malls, females should cover their shoulders and knees, therefore sleeveless tops and short shorts are not permitted. However, the dress code is not strictly enforced in public places and it is very common to see people wearing all kinds of outfits at those places, especially in Dubai. On the beach or at the pool, people wear swimsuits and it is allowed.

Cheque bounces 
The wording of the Federal Penal Code provides presumption of bad faith on the part of 'anyone who draws a draft without a sufficient and drawable balance.' However, in practice, it is far more common for a cheque to be deposited by the payee as a tool to threaten and blackmail rather than male fides on the part of the drawer.

Homosexuality

Homosexuality is illegal and a crime punishable by law with up to death.

Public display of affection
Romantic kissing in public places is considered discourteous to the Emirati culture and is discouraged. However, normal kissing or hugging is acceptable. Engaging in sexual intercourse in public areas is a crime punishable by law.

Other offenses 
Article 1 of the Federal Penal Code states that "provisions of the Islamic Law shall apply to the crimes of doctrinal punishment, punitive punishment and blood money." The Federal Penal Code repealed only those provisions within the penal codes of individual emirates which are contradictory to the Federal Penal Code. Hence, both are enforceable simultaneously.

A new federal law in the UAE prohibits swearing in WhatsApp and penalizes swearing by a $68,061 fine and imprisonment, expats are penalized by deportation. In July 2015, an Australian expat was deported for swearing in Facebook.

During the month of Ramadan, it is illegal to publicly eat, drink, or smoke between sunrise and sunset. Exceptions are made for pregnant women and children. The law applies to both Muslims and non-Muslims, and failure to comply results in arrest.

Personal status law
Sharia law dictates the personal status law, which regulate matters such as marriage, divorce and child custody. The Sharia-based personal status law is applied to Muslims and even non-Muslims if they volunteer. Non-Muslims can be liable to Sharia rulings on marriage, divorce and child custody. However, the burden is on the Non Muslim party to request that foreign family laws are applied on a particular case. Judges would entertain such requests in line with Article 1 of the Personal Status Law.

In 2015, non-Muslims owning assets in the Emirate of Dubai were given the option to register their wills with the DIFC Wills & Probate Registry. Previously, the Sharia Law could still apply to the real estate assets owned by the non-Muslims. This welcome change has brought certainty in this area of law. The wills can now be prepared by wills draftsman duly registered with the Registry.

Emirati women must receive permission from a male guardian to marry for the first time or before age of 25. The requirement has been federal law since 2005. In all emirates, it is illegal for Muslim women to marry non-Muslims.

Personal Status courts have exclusive jurisdiction to hear family disputes, including matters involving divorce, inheritances, child custody, child abuse and guardianship of minors.

Social security 
The UAE has no social security laws, but make available welfare benefits such as free hospital and medical care, education subsidies, water, and electricity. By virtue of the National Assistance Law, victims of catastrophic illnesses and disasters are entitled benefits. Social security payments are granted to people of old age, with disabilities or incapable of self support.

References

External links
Rape Laws in the United Arab Emirates and Perceptions of Rape and Sexual Assault

Islam in the United Arab Emirates
United Arab Emirates
Law of the United Arab Emirates